Folon may refer to:

Folon Region, Ivory Coast
Folon (album), a 1995 album by Salif Keita
Jean-Michel Folon (1934–2005), Belgian artist